Chanon Keanchan (born 24 January 1967) is a Thai hurdler. He competed in the men's 400 metres hurdles at the 1992 Summer Olympics.

References

1967 births
Living people
Athletes (track and field) at the 1992 Summer Olympics
Chanon Keanchan
Chanon Keanchan
Place of birth missing (living people)
Asian Games medalists in athletics (track and field)
Chanon Keanchan
Athletes (track and field) at the 1994 Asian Games
Medalists at the 1994 Asian Games
Chanon Keanchan
Chanon Keanchan
Southeast Asian Games medalists in athletics
Chanon Keanchan